State Route 129 (SR 129) is a state highway in the U.S. state of California, connecting State Route 1 in Watsonville in Santa Cruz County with U.S. Route 101 near San Juan Bautista in San Benito County.

Route description
The route begins at State Route 1 with an interchange. SR 129 does not cross into Santa Clara County but the road comes within 700-900 feet of the Santa Cruz-San Clara County line. The road then heads northeast into the town of Watsonville along Riverside Road,  where it intersects County Route G12. Heading eastward out of town, SR 129 roughly parallels the Pajaro River along the Santa Cruz-San Benito County line before entering San Benito County near Chittenden. Crossing the Pajaro River, the road runs southeast along Chittenden road to end at U.S. Route 101.

SR 129 near SR 1 is part of the National Highway System, a network of highways that are considered essential to the country's economy, defense, and mobility by the Federal Highway Administration.

Major intersections

See also

References

External links

Caltrans: Route 129 road conditions
California Highways: Route 129
California @ AARoads.com - State Route 129

129
State Route 129
State Route 129
Watsonville, California